Gerry Ward may refer to:

Gerry Ward (footballer) (1936–1994), English footballer
Gerry Ward (basketball) (born 1941), retired American basketball player

See also

Jerry Ward (disambiguation)
Gerald Ward (disambiguation)
Jeremy Ward (disambiguation)